Young England: A Illustrated Magazine for Boys Throughout the English-Speaking World is a British story paper that was published from 1880 until 1937 and aimed at a similar audience to the Boy's Own Paper.

Publishing history 
The paper was published by the London Sunday School Union and was a continuation of an earlier paper, Kind Words for Boys and Girls. The first issue went on sale on 3 January 1880. The paper began as a weekly but  became a monthly and finally  an annual publication.

Contents 
The paper had adventure, school and historical stories; articles on topics such as science, natural history, sports, hobbies and crafts; as well as verse, competitions and puzzles.

Notable contributors 
Among its contributors were Fenton Ash, Harold Avery, R. M. Ballantyne, T. C. Bridges, Frank T. Bullen, W. E. Cule, C. J. Cutcliffe Hyne, Henty Frith, Ross Harvey, G. A. Henty,  Ascott R. Hope, W. H. G. Kingston, David Ker, J. P. Lamb, Robert Leighton,  Percy Longhurst, George Manville Fenn, Rosa Mulholland, F. St. Mars, Dr William Gordon Stables, Percy F. Westerman and  Fred Whishaw.

List of editors 
 Benjamin Clarke (1880 - 1889)
 Thomas Archer (1889 - 1894)
 Horace George Groser (c. 1920s)

Other papers of similar title 
The annual Young Australia : An Illustrated Magazine for Boys Throughout the English-speaking World comprised the twelve monthly issues of Young England bound and issued with a new title for colonial sale.

References 

Defunct magazines published in the United Kingdom
Children's magazines published in the United Kingdom
Magazines established in 1880
Magazines disestablished in 1937
Magazines published in England
1880 in England
Magazines published in London